The 1909 Home Nations Championship was the twenty-seventh series of the rugby union Home Nations Championship. Six matches were played between 16 January and 20 March. It was contested by England, Ireland, Scotland and Wales.

Although not officially part of the tournament until 1910, matches were arranged with the French national team which were played during the Championship. During the 1909 Championship, three Home Nations faced France; England, Wales and Ireland. As they had done in the 1908 Championship, Wales beat all three Home Nation opponents and France, taking the Championship title, the Triple Crown and the Grand Slam.

Table

Scoring system
The matches for this season were decided on points scored. A try was worth three points, while converting a kicked goal from the try gave an additional two points. A dropped goal was worth four points, while a goal from mark and penalty goals were worth three points.

Results

Additional matches outside the Championship

The matches

Wales vs. England

Wales: Jack Bancroft (Swansea), Phil Hopkins (Swansea), Billy Trew (Swansea) capt., Johnnie Williams (Cardiff), Jack Jones (Newport), Dick Jones (Swansea), Dicky Owen (Swansea), Jake Blackmore (Abertillery), George Travers (Pill Harriers), George Hayward (Swansea), John Alf Brown (Cardiff), Billy O'Neill (Cardiff), Jim Webb (Abertillery), Tom Evans (Llanelli), Ivor Morgan (Swansea)

England: John Jackett (Leicester), Edgar Mobbs (Northampton), Frank Tarr (Oxford University), EW Assinder (Old Edwardians), BB Bennetts (Penzance), J Davey (Redruth) TG Wedge (St. Ives), JG Cooper (Moseley), Robert Dibble (Bridgwater & Albion) capt., WA Johns (Gloucester), AL Kewney (Leicester), AD Warrington-Morris (US Portsmouth), FG Handford (Manchester), H Archer (Guy's Hospital), ET Ibbitson (Headingley)

Scotland vs. Wales

Scotland: DG Schulze (Royal Navy College, Dartmouth), AW Angus (Watsonians), H Martin (Edinburgh Acads), CM Gilray (London Scottish), JT Simson (Watsonians), George Cunnigham (Oxford University), JM Tennant (West of Scotland), A Ross (Royal HSFP), GM Frew (Glasgow HSFP), JC MacCallum (Watsonians), JS Wilson (London Scottish), GC Gowlland (London Scottish), JM MacKenzie (Edinburgh University), JMB Scott (Edinburgh Acads.) capt., WE Kyle (Hawick)

Wales: Jack Bancroft (Swansea), Mel Baker (Newport), Billy Trew (Swansea) capt., Johnnie Williams (Cardiff), Jack Jones (Newport), Dick Jones (Swansea), Dicky Owen (Swansea), Edwin Thomas Maynard (Newport), George Travers (Pill Harriers), Dick Thomas (Mountain Ash), John Alf Brown (Cardiff), Jim Webb (Abertillery), Tom Evans (Llanelli), Ivor Morgan (Swansea), James Watts (Llanelli)

Ireland vs. England

Ireland: WP Hinton (Old Wesley), HB Thrift (Wanderers), James Cecil Parke (Monkstown), C Thompson (Collegians), EC Deane (Monkstown), FNB Smartt (Dublin University), G Pinion (Monkstown), GT Hamlet (Old Wesley), T Smyth (Malone), OJS Piper (Cork Constitution), F Gardiner (NIFC) capt., C Adams (Old Wesley), BA Solomons (Dublin University), HG Wilson (Malone), MG Garry (Bective Rangers)

England: John Jackett (Leicester), Edgar Mobbs (Northampton), Cyril Wright (Cambridge University), Ronnie Poulton-Palmer (Oxford University), AC Palmer (London H.), F Hutchinson (Headingley) HJH Sibree (Harlequins), HJS Morton (Cambridge University), Robert Dibble (Bridgwater & Albion) capt., WA Johns (Gloucester), AL Kewney (Leicester), AJ Wilson (Camborne School of Mines), FG Handford (Manchester), H Archer (Guy's Hospital), ET Ibbitson (Headingley)

Scotland vs. Ireland

Scotland: DG Schulze (Royal Navy College, Dartmouth), J Pearson (Watsonians), T Sloan (London Scottish), RH Lindsay-Watson (Hawick), JT Simson (Watsonians), JR McGregor (Edinburgh University), JM Tennant (West of Scotland), A Ross (Royal HSFP), GM Frew (Glasgow HSFP), JC MacCallum (Watsonians), CD Stuart (West of Scotland), WE Lely (London Scottish), JM MacKenzie (Edinburgh University), JMB Scott (Edinburgh Acads.) capt., WE Kyle (Hawick)

Ireland: WP Hinton (Old Wesley), HB Thrift (Wanderers), James Cecil Parke (Monkstown), C Thompson (Collegians), RM Magrath (Cork Constitution), F Gardiner (NIFC) capt., G Pinion (Monkstown), GT Hamlet (Old Wesley), T Smyth (Malone), OJS Piper (Cork Constitution), T Helpin (Garryowen), JC Blackham (Queens College, Cork), BA Solomons (Dublin University), HG Wilson (Malone), MG Garry (Bective Rangers)

Wales vs. Ireland

Wales: Jack Bancroft (Swansea), Phil Hopkins (Swansea), Billy Trew (Swansea) capt., Johnnie Williams (Cardiff), Jack Jones (Newport), Dick Jones (Swansea), Dicky Owen (Swansea), Edwin Thomas Maynard (Newport), George Travers (Pill Harriers), Rees Thomas (Pontypool), Phil Waller (Newport), Jim Webb (Abertillery), Tom Evans (Llanelli), Ivor Morgan (Swansea), James Watts (Llanelli)

Ireland: GJ Henebrey (Garryowen), HB Thrift (Wanderers), James Cecil Parke (Monkstown), C Thompson (Collegians), TJ Greeves (NIFC), FM McCormac (Wanderers), G Pinion (Monkstown), GT Hamlet (Old Wesley) capt., T Smyth (Malone), OJS Piper (Cork Constitution), T Helpin (Garryowen), JC Blackham (Queens College, Cork), BA Solomons (Dublin University), HG Wilson (Malone), MG Garry (Bective Rangers)

England vs. Scotland

England: John Jackett (Leicester), Edgar Mobbs (Northampton), Cyril Wright (Cambridge University), Ronnie Poulton-Palmer (Oxford University), AC Palmer (London H.), F Hutchinson (Headingley) HJH Sibree (Harlequins), HJS Morton (Cambridge University), Robert Dibble (Bridgwater & Albion) capt., WA Johns (Gloucester), AL Kewney (Leicester), Harold Harrison (Royal Marines), FG Handford (Manchester), FB Watson (US Portsmouth), ET Ibbitson (Headingley)

Scotland: DG Schulze (Royal Navy College, Dartmouth), J Pearson (Watsonians), H Martin (Edinburgh Acads), CM Gilray (London Scottish), JT Simson (Watsonians), George Cunningham (Oxford University) capt., JM Tennant (West of Scotland), James Reid Kerr (Greenock Wanderers), GM Frew (Glasgow HSFP), JC MacCallum (Watsonians), AR Moodie (St Andrews Uni), GC Gowlland (London Scottish), JM MacKenzie (Edinburgh University), JMB Scott (Edinburgh Acads.), WE Kyle (Hawick)

French matches

England vs. France

England: John Jackett (Leicester), Edgar Mobbs (Northampton), Frank Tarr (Leicester), Ronnie Poulton-Palmer (Oxford University), T Simpson, F Hutchinson (Headingley) RH Williamson, CA Bolton, Robert Dibble (Bridgwater & Albion) capt., WA Johns (Gloucester), AL Kewney (Leicester), AD Warrington-Morris, FG Handford (Manchester), H Archer (Guy's Hospital), ET Ibbitson (Headingley)

France:  J Caujolle, T Varvier (Stade Français), H Houblain, E Lesieur (Stade Français), Gaston Lane (Racing Club de France), A Hubert (Association Sportive Français), A Theuriet, A Masse (Stade Bordelais Universitaire), R Duval, P Guillemin, J Icard, R de Malmann (Racing Club de France), Marcel Communeau (Stade Français) capt., G Borchard, G Fourcade

France vs. Wales

France:  E de Jouvencel, T Varvier (Stade Français), P Sagot, E Lesieur (Stade Français), Gaston Lane (Racing Club de France), A Hubert (Association Sportive Français), A Theuriet, A Masse (Stade Bordelais Universitaire), P Dupre, P Mauriat (Lyon), J Icard, R de Malmann (Racing Club de France), Marcel Communeau (Stade Français) capt., G Borchard, G Fourcade

Wales: Jack Bancroft (Swansea), Mel Baker (Newport), Billy Trew (Swansea) capt., Johnnie Williams (Cardiff), Jack Jones (Newport), Dick Jones (Swansea), Dicky Owen (Swansea), Edwin Thomas Maynard (Newport), Thomas Lloyd (Neath), Rees Thomas (Pontypool), Phil Waller (Newport), Jim Webb (Abertillery), Tom Evans (Llanelli), Ivor Morgan (Swansea), James Watts (Llanelli)

Ireland vs. France

Ireland: GJ Henebrey (Garryowen), HB Thrift (Wanderers), James Cecil Parke (Monkstown), C Thompson (Collegians), TJ Greeves (NIFC), JJ O'Connor, G Pinion (Monkstown), GT Hamlet (Old Wesley), C Adams (Old Wesley), OJS Piper (Cork Constitution), T Helpin (Garryowen), JC Blackham (Queens College, Cork), BA Solomons (Dublin University), F Gardiner (NIFC) capt., MG Garry (Bective Rangers)

France:  E de Jouvencel, M Burgun, F Mouronval, E Lesieur (Stade Français), Gaston Lane (Racing Club de France), A Hubert (Association Sportive Français), C Martin, M Legraine, P Guillemin, P Mauriat (Lyon), M Hourdebaigt, R de Malmann (Racing Club de France), Marcel Communeau (Stade Français) capt., G Borchard, J Gommes

External links

1908-09
1908–09 in British rugby union
1908–09 in English rugby union
rugby union
1908–09 in Welsh rugby union 
1908–09 in Scottish rugby union 
Home Nations Championship
Home Nations Championship
Home Nations Championship